CD-154 or No. 154 was a Type D escort ship of the Imperial Japanese Navy during World War II.

History
She was laid down on 12 October 1944 at the Harima shipyard of Harima Shipyard Company Ltd. for the benefit of the Imperial Japanese Navy and launched on 26 December 1944. On 7 February 1945, she was completed and commission and attached to the Kure Naval District. On 3 March 1945, she was assigned to the First Escort Fleet. On 10 April 1945, she was assigned to the Seventh Fleet. On 30 June 1945, she hit a mine and was damaged off Hesaki Lighthouse. She survived the war and on 5 October 1945, she was struck from the Navy List. She served as a minesweeper after the war until 10 September 1947 when she was ceded to Great Britain. She was later scrapped.

References

1945 ships
Ships built by IHI Corporation
Type D escort ships